Saint Bernard refers primarily to Bernard of Clairvaux (1090–1153), a Christian saint, mystic, and reformer of the Cistercian order.

Another prominent meaning is St. Bernard (dog), a breed of dog.

St. Bernard, St Bernard or San Bernard may also refer to:

People
Bernard degli Uberti (d. 1133), Catholic saint, Italian abbot, bishop, papal legate, and cardinal
Bernard of Corleone (1605–1667), Sicilian friar, Franciscan Blessed
Bernard of Menthon (c. 1020–1081 or 1086), Catholic saint, Frankish founder of the hostel at Great St Bernard Pass, and namesake of the famous dog breed
Bernard of Thiron (1046–1117), Catholic saint, French founder of the Tironensian Order
Bernardo Tolomei (1272–1348), Catholic saint, Italian theologian and founder of the Olivetans
Bernard of Vienne (778–842), Catholic saint, French bishop of Vienne 810–842.

Places

Brazil
 São Bernardo do Campo, São Paulo, municipality in the Metropolitan Region of São Paulo
 São Bernardo, Maranhão, municipality in the Northeast region of Brazil

Canada
 Saint-Bernard-de-Lacolle, Quebec, municipality in Montérégie region
 Saint-Bernard, Quebec, municipality in Chaudière-Appalaches region
 Saint-Bernard-de-Michaudville, Quebec, municipality in Les Maskoutains Regional County Municipality, Montérégie region
 Saint-Bernard-sur-Mer, community in the municipality of L'Isle-aux-Coudres, Quebec
 St. Bernard, Nova Scotia, community in the District of Clare, Digby County

France
Saint-Bernard, Ain, commune in Auvergne-Rhône-Alpes region
Saint-Bernard, Côte-d'Or, commune in Bourgogne-Franche-Comté region
Saint-Bernard, Haut-Rhin, commune in Alsace, Grand Est region
Saint-Bernard, Isère, commune in Auvergne-Rhône-Alpes region

Philippines
Saint Bernard, Southern Leyte, fourth-class municipality, Eastern Visayas region

Switzerland
(Col du) Grand Saint-Bernard, French name for Great St Bernard Pass, road pass in south-western Switzerland, to Italy
Great St Bernard Tunnel, tunnel circumventing Great St Bernard Pass
English for San Bernardino Pass, a Swiss Alpine pass connecting Thusis (Graubünden) and Bellinzona (Ticino) in south-eastern Switzerland.

United States
St. Bernard, Ohio, village in Hamilton County
St. Bernard Parish, Louisiana, in the New Orleans–Metairie–Kenner Metropolitan Statistical Area
Saint Bernard, Louisiana, unincorporated community in St. Bernard Parish
Saint Bernard, Nebraska, unincorporated community in Platte County
St. Bernard Township, Platte County, Nebraska, township in Platte County
San Bernard River, in Texas
San Bernard National Wildlife Refuge, wildlife conservation area along the Texas coast

Other
 St. Bernard, a brand formerly used by Dunnes Stores
Texan schooner San Bernard, two-masted ship of the Second Texas Navy

See also
Barnard (disambiguation)
Bernard (disambiguation)
Bernhard (disambiguation)
San Bernardino (disambiguation)
San Bernardo (disambiguation)
São Bernardo (disambiguation)
St Bernard Pass (disambiguation)
St. Bernard's School (disambiguation)